Gaius Asinius Pollio was a Roman senator and orator active during the Principate. He was ordinary consul for 23 with Gaius Antistius Vetus as his colleague. He was the oldest son of Gaius Asinius Gallus; his brother was Marcus Asinius Agrippa, consul in 25. Pollio's mother was Vipsania Agrippina. Through her, he was the half-brother of the younger Drusus.

We know from his coins Pollio was proconsular governor of Asia. In 45, Pollio was exiled as an accuser of a conspiracy and later was put to death on orders from Empress Valeria Messalina.

The Asinia Pollionis filia mentioned on an inscription from Tusculum may have been his daughter. Pollio was perhaps the father (or brother) of Gaius Asinius Placentinus who lived around the middle of the 1st century.

See also
Gaius Asinius Pollio, his grandfather, the 1st-century BC consul and historian

Notes

References
William Smith, Dictionary of Greek and Roman Biography and Mythology, Kindle Edition; ASIN: B00LSQHSGY

Imperial Roman consuls
Roman governors of Asia
Pollio, Gaius
1st-century Romans
Year of birth unknown
Year of death unknown